Jules Adeline (28 April 1845, Rouen - 24 August 1909, Rouen) was a French designer, engraver, illustrator, and historian. He produced over 9,000 images; largely devoted to Rouen and the surrounding areas.

Life and work 
His father, Louis Adeline, was a local artist. He attended the Lycée Pierre-Corneille. During the Franco-Prussian War, he was a Sous-lieutenant with the 2nd Battalion in Rouen. Shortly after the war, he began to produce designs and architectural projects, and created his first etching in 1872. Three of his pieces were chosen by the publisher, Alfred Cadart, for his album L'Illustration nouvelle.

In 1873, he designed a small monument, honoring the engraver, Louis-Henri Brévière, erected in Forges-les-Eaux. The bust was melted down during World War II. He also designed a monument to those who died during the Siege of Toul.  

From 1873 to 1885, he regularly exhibited his engravings at the Salon, and was awarded a medal at the Centennial Exposition in Philadelphia.

He was a member of the Commission Départementale des Antiquités, the Commission Départementale d'Architecture, and the Commission of the École supérieure d'art et design Le Havre-Rouen. In 1880, he was elected a member of the Académie de Rouen; serving as its President in 1890. He was one of the founding members of the Société des Amis des Monuments Rouennais in 1886. That same year, he was named a Knight in the Legion of Honor.

In addition to his fame as an engraver, he was a noted collector of Japanese dolls.

References

Further reading 
 Sophie Nasi, "De l’image au simulacre : le vieux Rouen de J. Adeline à l’exposition de 1896", In: Études Normandes, 2003, #4
 Sophie Nasi, "Le vieux Rouen vu par Jules Adeline (1845-1909)", In: Bulletin de la Société des amis des monuments rouennais, 2004-2005, pp.33-48 
 Stéphane Rioland, "Jules Adeline, le théâtre de la ville", In: Précis analytique des travaux de l'Académie des sciences, belle-lettres et arts de Rouen, 2018-2020, Rouen, 2020, pp. 29-62. 
 Stéphane Rioland, "Jules Adeline, un japonisant rouennais", In: Le Japon illustré, de Hokusaï à l'école Utagawa, Fage éditions, Lyon, 2009.

External links 

 Works by and about Jules Adeline @ Rouen Nouvelles Bibliothèques

1845 births
1909 deaths
French engravers
French illustrators
French designers
Recipients of the Legion of Honour
Artists from Rouen